Puzzlegeddon is a puzzle/strategy video game, made by Swedish developer Pieces Interactive. It was released for Microsoft Windows on November 27, 2008, for Xbox Live Arcade on December 16, 2009, and for PlayStation Network on December 17, 2009.

Gameplay

In the game, users play on a puzzle board made up of 6 × 6 blocks. The points, or resources, accumulated on the puzzle board is then used to purchase abilities which are used to attack and defend against opponents spread out over a globe.

The main game screen is centered on a view of a globe that is located in one of various galaxies. In the center of this globe the puzzle board is located and along the horizon of the globe each player is located. All interaction with the game is done by using the mouse to click on the different elements appearing on the globe.

The gameplay is based around matches between up to 6 players or computer-controlled players. The game supports multiplayer matches over the Internet or over LAN.

History
Participating with an early version of the game, Puzzlegeddon won "Best PC Game" during the 2007 Swedish Game Awards.

Reception
Go Fanboy gave the game 8 out of 10. They commented that the game was easily worth the low price despite some minor flaws.

See also
Puzzle Quest
Chuzzle

References

External links
Official site
Pieces Interactive

2008 video games
Puzzle video games
Windows games
Xbox 360 Live Arcade games
PlayStation 3 games
PlayStation Network games
Video games developed in Sweden
Pieces Interactive games